Jukka Tapio Linkola (born 21 July 1955 in Espoo) is a Finnish jazz pianist and classical composer. He has composed music for the Finnish National Opera and led several jazz Big Bands. In addition he has won two Jussi awards for his film music, which another came from the 1988 film The Glory and Misery of Human Life. His euphonium concerto is considered a standard in the repertoire.

References 

1955 births
Finnish composers
Finnish male composers
Finnish jazz pianists
Living people
Male pianists
21st-century pianists
21st-century male musicians
Male jazz musicians